The Beckoning Shore is a novel by E. V. Timms. It was popular, selling 10,000 copies within its first year.

The novel was adapted for radio in 1954.

References

External links
The Beckoning Shore at AustLit

1950 Australian novels
Angus & Robertson books